The Ukrainian National Women's League of America (UNWLA) is a charitable and cultural organization that unites women of Ukrainian descent and affiliation. Since its establishment in 1945, the organization has launched numerous social welfare, culture, and education projects, aiming to support the Ukrainian people in Ukraine and diasporas. It works independently as a charitable and cultural organization and has been granted 501(c)(3) tax-exempt status by the Internal Revenue Service.

Since February 2022, UNWLA has focused on more humanitarian aid operations in response to the Russian invasion of Ukraine Russian Invasion of Ukraine. According to the recent DEMAC report, UNWLA raised approximately $750,000 for Ukrainian humanitarian aid in one month.  The organization continues fundraising and advocacy events to address the Russian invasion.

Mission and Vision 
The mission of the UNWLA is to unite women of Ukrainian descent or active in the Ukrainian-American community in order to: 

a) preserve Ukrainian national identity and cultural heritage by means of research and study of Ukrainian history, literature, art, culture, and traditions;  

b) inform the general public about Ukraine and its culture, history, language, literature, art, as well as Ukrainian social and national ideals and aspirations; 

c) provide financial assistance to people of Ukrainian descent within and outside the United States, specifically for educational studies and research into Ukrainian history and culture; 

d) initiate and maintain ties with other Ukrainian organizations, as well as with American and international organizations that have educational and charitable objectives, especially with women's organizations; 

e) support The Ukrainian Museum in New York, which was founded by the UNWLA; 

f) participate in Ukrainian, American, and/or international women's movements. 

To fulfill this mission, the UNWLA has established a network of Branches across the United States, governed by Regional Councils. The organization organizes conferences, programs and fundraising events, engages in advocacy, establishes and maintains educational, charitable, and cultural programs. To keep all members across the states informed about UNWLA activities, “Our Life” and other publications are released throughout the year. The UNWLA cooperates with other organizations, especially with women-centered entities, and engages in other other activities consistent with its mission, Bylaws, and Certificate of Incorporation, or any applicable laws.

Structure 
UNWLA Bylaws define the internal organizational structure and the division of responsibilities and duties. The highest legislative body of the UNWLA is the UNWLA Convention, which is held every three years. The organizational structure of the UNWLA consists of a National Board and Executive Committee, Regional Councils, Branches, and Members at Large.

History

Founding the UNWLA
Established in 1925 by five Ukrainian women's associations in New York City area, the UNWLA was inspired by the women's organization that flourished in western Ukraine in the 1920-30s, Ukrainian Women's League, Союз Українок, from which the UNWLA adopted its name. The initial goal was to unite all Ukrainian women's groups in the United States under one umbrella to help their homeland that was struggling for national independence in the center of Eastern Europe and coordinate efforts to provide long-distance humanitarian aid. Another important goal was to inform the free world about events in Ukraine, to support the homeland both spiritually and materially, and to promote the preservation of Ukrainian national identity, cultural heritage, and ethnic traditions in the United States. While originally focused on alleviating the struggles of Ukraine, fundraising and volunteer work resulted in the building of churches and community centers, children's education, the establishment of scholarly and cultural institutions.

The reason for unification was the exclusion of the National Council of Women (NCW) of Ukraine from the International Council of Women at the ICW's General assembly held in Washington, D.C., in May 1925. The NCW of Ukraine had been a member of the ICW since 1920.

and the name given to the new organization was "Soyuz Ukrayinok Ameryky" - Ukrainian National Women's League of America.

International Women's Movement 
During the UNWLA's early years, the organization found support with the International Institutes of the YWCA, a program established by Edith Bremer (1865-1964). Its philosophy validates immigrant women's values of ethnic pride and retention of culture. UNWLA members promoted the Ukrainian presence in America with exhibitions of folk art and cultural performances in prestigious venues such as the annual Women's International Exposition in New York City. The folk art exhibit installed at the Ukrainian Pavilion at the 1933 Chicago World's Fair became the cornerstone of The Ukrainian Museum collection.

In 1948, as UNWLA gained recognition, the organization became the first ethnic organization in the United States to become an associate member of the General Federation of Women's Clubs. Joining the GFWC gave the UNWLA a standing to participate in national and international events on an equal footing with other American women's organizations. UNWLA President Olena D. Lototsky served on the board of directors of the American Federation of International Institutes (1953-1959) and in 1958, was honored as a Woman of Achievement alongside other ethnic and minority group leaders. In 1952 the UNWLA was admitted to the National Council of Women of the United States (NCW) of the United States. In 1993, Iryna Kurowyckyj (UNWLA President, 1999-2008) was elected president of the NCW, the first woman of Ukrainian descent to hold this top position of women's representation in the country.

Since  the same 1948, the UNWLA is also a founding member of the World Federation of the Ukrainian Women's Organizations (WFUWO). This organization gave Ukrainian women in non-Soviet countries an entrance into the sector of international non-governmental organizations (NGOs), direct involvement in the United Nations, and access to international women's conferences.

Preserving the Ukrainian Culture 
As an organization based on ethnic identity, the UNWLA has weathered repeated challenges to its continuity. Realizing the importance of the Ukrainian language as a window into the survival of Ukraine as a state, the delegates to the first UNWLA Convention in 1932 passed the first of the many resolutions to cultivate the use of Ukrainian within the organization. Thinking of Ukrainian as a lingua franca that can potentially unite Ukrainians across the continents lead the UNWLA to become an effective influencer. The UNWLA in many ways shaped a Ukrainian style of life in the diaspora, offering guidance on domestic décor, cuisine, leisure and educational activities. It also developed, managed and staffed a standard Ukrainian pre-school program across the country, named svytlychka. The program aims to ensure that future generations born in the US would grow up to be bilingual and biculturally literate Ukrainian Americans.

Support of Ukraine 
Encouraging proactive citizenship, the UNWLA urged members not only to vote, but also to share their views with elected representatives. In 1933, when the Soviet-engineered genocidal famine, the Holodomor, raged in central Ukraine, the UNWLA acted valiantly with humanitarian action and a public relations campaign that is still noteworthy for its courage and moral clarity. During World War II, UNWLA participated in many civic actions, such as honoring Gold Star Mothers among its membership, selling US War Bonds, and working for the American Red Cross. In the immediate post-war period, the women focused on the plight of Ukrainian displaced persons that had been settled in refugee camps throughout Western Europe, sending care packages to the camps, resettling war widows, and greeting the refugees who arrived by ship to America.

In the Cold War, the efforts of the UNWLA were focused on preservation of identity coupled with advocacy for the individual and collective human rights of women in Soviet Ukraine.

1991–2014 
Initially, the UNWLA worked to inform the world about cultural and political repression in Ukraine during the Soviet times. Since 1991, the year Ukraine proclaimed its independence, UNWLA members have been sending petitions to senators and congressional representatives, requesting their support for the advancement of Ukraine's political and economic reform. One example of the UNWLA's work in this respect was the organization's active participation in the Jackson–Vanik Coalition, which was instrumental in the successful push to turn the Jackson–Vanik amendment into law, thereby normalizing trade relations between Ukraine and the United States.

2014–2022 
Since Russia's invasion of Ukraine in 2014, the renewed threat to Ukraine's sovereignty has deepened UNWLA's humanitarian mission to ensure not only Ukraine's physical, psychological, and spiritual survival, but also healing, with the focus of aiding the victims of war. With the challenges encountered during the pandemic of 2020, the UNWLA mission has continued to evolve.

Response to the Russian full-scale invasion of Ukraine 
Since the full-scale Russian invasion of Ukraine on February 24th, 2022, the UNWLA has focused its operations on relief efforts. These include fundraising, political advocacy, direct donations of medical equipment and other goods, and educational and cultural outreach. The UNWLA leveraged partnerships with international and local organizations to start delivering humanitarian aid to Ukraine. 

During the first week of the invasion, members of the UNWLA engaged in a 7-Day Advocacy Challenge, where they called their representatives and sent letters to local newspapers to encourage Ukrainian humanitarian and military aid. Members also distributed petitions and emailed corporations and universities to encourage divestment from Russian investments, and called on American cities to break ties with their Russian sister cities. 

The UNWLA has formed emergency response teams for the crisis, including teams on Administration, Advocacy, Corporate Fundraising, Humanitarian Medical Aid, Immigration/Visas/Temporary Protected Status, Media Inquiries, Non-Medical Supplies, Social Media, and Social Welfare. The national fundraising campaign focuses on gathering funds to purchase external fixators and wound-vac machines to treat wounded civilians and soldiers in Ukraine. The supplies for this equipment is distributed among the hospitals in Ukraine.

Major initiatives
UNWLA Social Welfare Fund provides medical and humanitarian aid to Ukraine and other countries of the world, focusing on orphans and elderly women in Ukraine. In 2022 UNWLA funding helped to evacuate children from an orphanage in Pokrovsk to Germany. Multiple other grassroots initiatives supported mothers affected by the war.

Ukrainian Museum
Since 1926, the UNWLA has been organizing exhibits of Ukrainian folk art at American institutions with the goal of familiarizing the public with the diverse cultural heritage of Ukrainians. One of the major initial efforts was the exhibition of the Ukrainian folk art at the Chicago World's Fair in 1933. Between 1967 and 1973, the UNWLA maintained the Museum of Ukrainian Folk Art until it founded the Ukrainian Museum in New York, NY, in 1976. The UNWLA retains 51% of the votes on the board of directors of the Museum.

UNWLA Student Sponsorship Program 
UNWLA Scholarship Program was founded in 1967 and through the years of its existence, millions of dollars in scholarships were directed to enable secondary school and college students in Ukraine and the diaspora to complete their studies.

Our Life
The first issue of Our Life, a bilingual monthly magazine, was published in 1944. Since then a one-pager has evolved into a glossy magazine, still released in Ukrainian and English to all of UNWLA members. It features articles about Ukrainian culture, art, people, events in Ukraine and the Ukrainian diaspora.

References

Further reading
 Alexander Lushnycky, Ukrainians in Pennsylvania: a contribution to the growth of the Commonwealth (1976), ASIN B001DDBMC8
 Alex Lushnycky, Ukrainians of Greater Philadelphia (2007), 
 Stephen P. Haluszczak, Ukrainians of Western Pennsylvania (2009), 
 Myron B. Kuropas, Ukrainians of Chicagoland (2006), 
 Nancy Karen Wichar, Ukrainians of Metropolitan Detroit (2010),

External links

 Official website of the organization

Women's organizations based in the United States
Charities based in New York (state)
Ukrainian culture
Ukrainian-American history
Ukrainian American